Signal Morning is the second studio album by the psychedelic rock band Circulatory System. It was released on September 8, 2009, on the Cloud Recordings label.

Track listing
All tracks composed by Will Cullen Hart.

Side A
"Woodpecker Greeting Worker Ant" - 3:22
"Rocks and Stones" - 2:42
"This Morning (We Remembered Everything)" - 2:43
"Tiny Concerts" - 2:04
"Electronic Diversion" - :47
"Overjoyed" - 2:29
"The Breathing Universe" - 1:09
"News from the Heavenly Loom" - :23
"Round Again" - 5:36

Side B
"I You We" - 1:31
"Blasting Through" - 4:15
"Particle Parades" - 4:44
"Gold Will Stay" - 3:37
"The Frozen Lake / The Symmetry" - 2:38
"Until Moon Medium Hears the Message" - 3:17
"(Drifts)" - 2:04
"Signal Morning" - 2:54

References

2009 albums
Circulatory System (band) albums